The Syria national Under-17 football team is the national football youth team of Syria and is controlled by the Syrian Football Association.

History
The first official appearance of a Syrian U-17 choice was in the AFC U-17 Championship 2002 Qualification.
In Group Two of the qualification, Syria beat Saudi Arabia 1-0 on aggregate, the only goal coming in the second leg in Syria, and so qualified for the finals at the first attempt.

In the AFC U-17 Championship 2002, Syria beat Qatar in the first match of the group stage, then followed a draw against Uzbekistan and a defeat against Japan before falling to a 2-1 defeat against Yemen in the quarter-finals.

Three years later, Syria qualified for the AFC U-17 Championship 2006 in Singapore. Despite being beaten 1-0 by China in their opening game, the Syrian team advanced to the second round with a 7-0 win over Bangladesh and a 2-0 victory against Vietnam. Syria reached the quarter-finals and won 2-1 against Saudi Arabia, but lost 2-0 in the semi finals against eventual champions Japan. Despite losing the third place playoff against Tajikistan in a penalty shootout, they qualified for the 2007 FIFA U-17 World Cup in South Korea.

In Thailand 2014, Syria was among the four semi-finalists who qualified for Chile 2015.

Competition Records

FIFA U-17 World Cup Record

<div style="text-align:left">

AFC U-16 Championship Record 

*Draws include knockout matches decided on penalty kicks.
<div style="text-align:left">

See also 
Syria national football team
Syria national under-23 football team
Syria national under-20 football team
Syrian Football Association
Football in Syria

References

Asian national under-17 association football teams
Under-17